Ciudad de Vigo Básquet, more commonly referred to today by its sponsorship name of KICS Ciudad de Vigo, was a professional Basketball team based in Vigo, Galicia. After the 2009-10 season, the team was dissolved.

Former names
 Gestibérica Ciudad de Vigo (—2009)
 Kics Ciudad de Vigo (2009–10)

Season by season

Trophies and awards

Trophies
LEB Bronce: (1)
2008

Notable players
 Robert Traylor
 Sotiris Manolopoulos

External links
Ciudad de Vigo Básquet

Defunct basketball teams in Spain
Former LEB Oro teams
Basketball teams in Galicia (Spain)
Basketball teams established in 2004
Basketball teams disestablished in 2010
Sport in Vigo